Atlas Honda (AHL), formerly known as Atlas Autos, is a Pakistani motorcycle manufacturer owned by Atlas Group and Honda Motor Company and based in Karachi, Pakistan since 1962. It is the largest motorcycle maker and a market leader in Pakistan.

History

The company was created in 1988 after Panjdarya and Atlas Autos merged. AHL manufactures and markets Honda motorcycles in collaboration with Honda Motor Company. The company also manufactures various hi-tech components in-house in collaboration with leading parts manufacturers like Showa Atsumitech, Nippon Denso and Toyo Denso. The company also exports motorcycles to Sri Lanka, Afghanistan and Bangladesh. Atlas Honda has Pakistan's largest in-house manufacturing capability at its Karachi and Sheikhupura plants, which include an R&D wing and tool making facilities through CAD/CAM. The annual assembly production capacity of AHL is 1.35 million units, with 150,000 units from the Karachi plant and 1.2 million units from the Sheikhupura plant.

In March 2023, Atlas Honda halted its production due to raw material shortages caused by import difficulties. The plant shutdown began on March 9, 2023, and lasted until March 31, 2023, making it the longest shutdown among Pakistan's struggling automakers. The company issued a notice to the Pakistan Stock Exchange explaining that its supply chain was severely disrupted, leaving it unable to continue production.

Products
 Honda CD 70
 Honda CD Dream 70
 Honda Pridor
 Honda CG125
 Honda CG125 Self
 Honda CB125F
 Honda CB150F

See also
 List of motorcycle manufacturers 
 List of Honda motorcycles

References

External links 
 Atlas Honda Limited
 Honda Bikes Price In Pakistan

Motorcycle manufacturers of Pakistan
Honda
Manufacturing companies based in Karachi
Vehicle manufacturing companies established in 1962
1962 establishments in Pakistan
Companies listed on the Pakistan Stock Exchange
Honda